Debra Ann Opri is an American attorney. Opri's main office is in Los Angeles. Opri is licensed to practice law in California, New York, New Jersey, and the District of Columbia D.C.  Opri is best known as a celebrity attorney and guest commentator on divorce and other high-profile cases

Biography
Debra Opri was born in  New Jersey. She graduated from New York University and from Whittier Law School, Los Angeles, California.  Opri has been practicing law in California for over thirty years

Attorney
Debra Opri is a lawyer who gained a reputation as a celebrity attorney when she successfully represented James Brown against a sexual harassment lawsuit by a former employee. Opri came to international attention as the lawyer who represented the parents of  Michael Jackson, Joseph Jackson and Katherine Jackson, who hired Opri to protect their interests after their son was charged with child molestation; as well as Pamela Hasselhoff and Jermaine Jackson in their divorces.

Other high-profile cases included Anna Nicole Smith on a paternity action by her ex-boyfriend. Debra Opri was successful in securing the father's paternity rights and in his gaining custody of his daughter, Dannilynn, after Anna Nicole died in February, 2007. Opri also represented Kevin Hart in divorce proceedings, and Liza Marquez in a case against David Caruso. In the Nichelle Nichols case Opri represented Nichols manager Gilbert Bell.  Opri also represents the football player, LeGarrette Blount, among other professionals.

Debra Opri is licensed to practice law in California, New York, New Jersey, and the District of Columbia [D.C.], and is the founder of the law firm, Opri & Associates, APLC, located in Beverly Hills, California.

Media
Debra Opri continues to practice law through her law firm and continues to be a media personality on current legal cases and issues, with regular television and radio appearances.

Opri has been sought out by national media to comment of high-profile cases, including the International Business Times, and Life and Style on Angelina Jolie and Brad Pitt Divorce, The Daily Beast on Justin Bieber, Inside Edition on Jerry Lewis, The Lawyer Monthly on US Supreme Court Ruling on Muslin Ban, Fox News on the Johnny Depp and Amber Heard breakup.  Radio and television interviews also include the Jeffrey Epstein and Bill Cosby cases.

References

External links
 

American lawyers
Living people
1960 births
New York University alumni
American women lawyers
Whittier Law School alumni
21st-century American women